Club de Fútbol Pachuca Premier is a professional football team that plays in the Mexican Football League. They are playing in the Liga Premier (Mexico's Third Division). Club de Fútbol Pachuca Premier is affiliated with C.F. Pachuca who plays in the Liga MX. The games were held in the city of Pachuca in the Estadio Hidalgo.

History
Originally C.F. Pachuca began to develop its players through the Pachuca Juniors team, which participated between 2004 and 2009. Later the club maintained its sports policy through other teams such as Universidad del Fútbol, Tampico Madero and Titanes de Tulancingo, finally all of them were dissolved or reformed.

In 2015 the Mexican Football Federation and Liga MX forced all member clubs of the league to have a team in the Liga Premier de Ascenso so that youth players between 20 and 23 years old could have activity, because they had already passed the age to be part of the youth leagues.

In 2018 the team was withdrawn due to the fact that most of the Liga MX clubs decided to eliminate their teams from the Liga Premier. After the dissolution of Pachuca Premier, the club Tlaxcala F.C. it became the team in charge of the development of soccer players that Pachuca Premier maintained.

On July 1, 2022 Pachuca Premier was reactivated after a 4–years hiatus due to the need of the club to have a development team after the sale of the shares of Tlaxcala F.C. that were owned by Grupo Pachuca and in the face of future loan restrictions for football players. Since 2022 Pachuca is the only team in Liga MX that has a squad participating in the Serie A de México.

Players

First-team squad

References

 
Football clubs in Hidalgo (state)
Liga Premier de México